Michaela Pejzlová (born 6 April 1997) is a Czech ice hockey player and member of the Czech national ice hockey team, currently playing in the Finnish Naisten Liiga (NSML) with HIFK Naiset. She played her collegiate career with the Clarkson Golden Knights of ECAC Hockey, twice winning the NCAA Championship. 

Pejzlová represented the Czech Republic at the IIHF Women's World Championships in 2016, 2017, 2019, 2021, and 2022, and at the Division I Group A tournament in 2015.

Playing career
Pejzlová started her career playing with HC Pardubice of the Czech Women's Extraliga before joining the Czech U18 national team, and later the Czech senior national team. She attended Stanstead College in Stanstead, Quebec during her final years of secondary school and played two seasons with the Stanstead Spartans girls' ice hockey team.

Freshman year 
Pejzlová joined a talented Clarkson team that had won the National Championship three years previous and made the NCAA Tournament four straight seasons. She quickly established herself as a key contributor, splitting time between the top two lines. She scored in her first career game against Penn State on 9 September 2016 at 6:01 of the second period. Pejzlová recorded 11 goals and 21 assists as the team's highest-scoring rookie en route to Clarkson's second National Championship. 2016–17 Awards 
 ECAC Rookie of the Week (twice)
 ECAC Rookie of the Month (October, November)
 ECAC Weekly Honor Roll (Five Times)
 Windjammer Classic All-Tournament Team

Sophomore year 
Pejzlová played the majority of the 2017–18 season centering Loren Gabel and Élizabeth Giguère on Clarkson's top line as well as centering the pair on the top power play unit. Pejzlová put up 26 goals and 29 assists and had a 15-game point streak during the regular season. With the top line leading the way, Clarkson won its second straight National Championship. 2017–2018 Awards 
 ECAC Weekly Honor Roll (twice)

Awards and honors

Career statistics

Regular season and playoffs 

Sources:

International

Sources:

References

External links
 
 

1997 births
Living people
Clarkson Golden Knights women's ice hockey players
Czech expatriate ice hockey players in Canada
Czech expatriate ice hockey players in Finland
Czech expatriate ice hockey players in the United States
Czech women's ice hockey forwards
HIFK Naiset players
Ice hockey players at the 2022 Winter Olympics
Naisten Liiga All-Stars
Olympic ice hockey players of the Czech Republic
Sportspeople from Pardubice
Stanstead College alumni